Trinity Lutheran College may refer to:
Trinity Lutheran College, Ashmore, Queensland, Australia
Trinity Lutheran College, Everett, Washington, USA